The 2021 W Series Silverstone round was the third round of seven in the 2021 W Series, and took place at the Silverstone Circuit in the United Kingdom on 17th July 2021. The event was an undercard to the 2021 Formula One World Championship round at the same circuit.

Report

Background
Abbi Pulling replaced Gosia Rdest at the Puma W Series Team.

Jamie Chadwick led the championship on 33 points, 3 points ahead of Sarah Moore.

Race
Fabienne Wohlwend took the fight to polesitter Alice Powell off the line, the Liechtensteiner prevailing in a side-by-side fight that lasted three corners. Beitske Visser once again struggled to get away from the line and dropped into the midfield, whereas Miki Koyama remained stuck on the grid for a lengthy period with gearbox issues that had been persistent through practice and qualifying.

Koyama lapped some six seconds off the pace with her issues at the back of the field before her gearbox cried enough on lap 8, forcing her to pull off the circuit at Village. This brought out the safety car, which proved Wohlwend's undoing as she had been gapping Powell but destroyed her tyres in the process. On lap 12, Wohlwend ran wide at Vale, allowing Powell to get the undercut at Club and muscle past for the lead.

On the final lap, Jessica Hawkins attempted to pass Belén García for 10th place and the final point at The Loop, but clattered into the side of the Spanish driver and put her out with suspension damage on the spot. Hawkins received a 20 second time penalty for the incident, making her the only British driver not to score points.

Powell won the race from Wohlwend and Jamie Chadwick. Visser recovered to sixth and Abbi Pulling scored points on her début with eighth.

Classification

Practice

Qualifying

Race

 – Hawkins received a 20 second time penalty for causing a collision.

Championship standings

See also
 2021 British Grand Prix

Notes

References

External links
 Official website
 Race replay

|- style="text-align:center"
|width="35%"|Previous race:
|width="30%"|W Series2021 season
|width="40%"|Next race:

W Series Silverstone
W Series Silverstone
Silverstone
W Series Silverstone